The 2000 Auburn Tigers football team represented Auburn University in the 2000 NCAA Division I-A football season.  They finished the season with a 9–4 record and won the Southeastern Conference West Division championship.  Second-year head coach Tommy Tuberville led the Tigers to their first winning season since 1997, their second SEC Championship Game appearance, and a New Year's Day appearance in the Florida Citrus Bowl against Michigan, which marked the Tigers return to post-season play for the first time in three years.  The Tigers shut out arch rival Alabama, 9–0, on November 18 in the first Iron Bowl game played in Tuscaloosa since 1901. The Tigers finished the season ranked #18 in the AP Poll and #20 in the Coaches Poll.

Schedule

Game summaries

Alabama

Roster

Rankings

References

Auburn
Auburn Tigers football seasons
Auburn Tigers football